The Edmund Fowle House is a historic house and local history museum at 28 Marshall Street in Watertown, Massachusetts, USA.  Built in 1772, it is the second-oldest surviving house in Watertown (after the Browne House, built c. 1698), and served as the meeting place for the Massachusetts Provincial Congress in the first year of the American Revolutionary War.  Now owned by the local historic society, it was listed on the National Register of Historic Places in 1977.

Description
The Edmund Fowle House is located northeast of Watertown Square, on the south side of Marshall Street between Spring and Mount Auburn Streets.  It is a two-story wood-frame structure, with a hip roof, central chimney, and clapboarded exterior.  It has a five-bay front facade, with a center entrance sheltered by a projecting enclosed flat-roofed vestibule.  The vestibule entry is flanked by sidelight windows and framed by fluted moulding.

History
The house was built by Edmund Fowle (1747–1821) in 1772, and was originally located on Mount Auburn St., then called Mill St.  Watertown was the seat of Massachusetts Provincial Congress, its de facto government, during the British occupation of Boston in the American Revolution. The committees of the 2nd and 3rd Provincial Congress met in this house from April 22 to July 19, 1775, and the Executive Committee met here from July 19, 1775, to September 18, 1776.  In 1776 the Treaty of Watertown, the first treaty signed between the newly formed United States of America and a foreign power, the St. John's and Mi'kmaq First Nations of Nova Scotia, was signed in this house.

Sturgis and Brigham Architects (Charles Brigham and John Hubbard Sturgis) purchased the house in 1871, moved it to its present Marshall St. address and converted it into a two family residence. The Historical Society of Watertown purchased the house in 1922.

The Historical Society was awarded $500,000 in 2004 and another $200,000 in 2006 by the Commonwealth of Massachusetts for the restoration of the Edmund Fowle House. The grand re-opening of the house took place in May 2008.

See also
 National Register of Historic Places listings in Middlesex County, Massachusetts

References

External links
 Historical Society of Watertown

Houses completed in 1772
Houses on the National Register of Historic Places in Middlesex County, Massachusetts
Historic house museums in Massachusetts
Museums in Middlesex County, Massachusetts
Buildings and structures in Watertown, Massachusetts
1772 establishments in Massachusetts
Georgian architecture in Massachusetts